This is the list of Punjabi films released in the Indian Punjab in the decade 2001-2010.

2010

2009

2008

2007

2006
Main Tu Assi Tussi - Kulbhushan Kharbanda, Manmeet, Upasana Singh, Rakesh Bedi, Sunita Dhir, Rana Jung Bahadar
Baghi (Release Date - 10/02/2006) - Om Puri, Girja Shankar, Parmveer Singh, Gurleen Chopra, Devinder Daman, Gaj Deol, Sardar Sohi, Jaswant Daman, Aneeta, Hardeep Doll (Dir: Sukhminder Dhanjal)
Dil Apna Punjabi - Harbhajan Mann, Neeru Bajwa, Mahek Chahal, Deep Dhillon, Sunita Dhir, Gurpreet Ghuggi, Rana Rabir, Dara Singh, Kanwaljit Singh, Amar Noorie (Dir: Manmohan Singh)
Ek Jind Ek Jaan (Release Date: 01/12/2006) - Raj Babber, Nagma, Aryan Vaid, Mighty Gill, Prabhleen Kaur, Arun Bakshi, Kulbir Bederson, Deep Dhillon, Gurpreet Ghuggi, Harbhajan Jabbal, Donny Kapoor, Jatinder Kaur, Rahul, Pammi Sandhu, Seetu, B. N. Sharma, Kuldip Sharma, Ritu Shivpuri, Prabheen Singh, Sameep Kang (Dir: Chitraarth)
Mannat Release Date; 06/10/2006)- Jimmy Shergill, Kulraj Randhawa, Manav Vij, Surinder Bath, Deep Dhillon, Rupinder Kaur, Anita Shabdish, Tarsinder Singh, Ramit Walia, Kanwaljit Singh (Dir: Gurbir Singh Grewal)
Rabb Ne Banaiyan Jodiean - Babbu Mann, Jajj Pandher, Doney Kapoor, Punit Issar, Gurpreet Ghuggi, Nilofar
Rustam-e-Hind - Parminder Doomchheri, Shivender Mahal, Doney Kapoor, Guggu Gill, B. B. Verma (Dir: J. S. Cheema)
Waaris Shah - Ishq Daa Warris  - Gurdas Mann, Juhi Chawla, Divya Dutta, Sushant Singh, Gurkirtan
Anokhe Amar Shaheed Baba Deep Singh Ji (Release Date: 28/07/2006) - Vindu Dara Singh, Deep Dhillon, Kashish, Afzal Khan, Gurpreet Singh, Murali A. Lalwani, Gurinder Makna, Sandip Singh, Jaswant Saggo (Jas), Rajwinder Singh Hundel (Dir: Jaswinder Chahal)
Mehndi Wale Hath — Gugu Gill, Manjeet Kullar, Gavie Chahal, Goldie, Sukhi Pawar, Prabhleen Kaur, Sania, Rana Ranbir, Gurkirtan (Written & Directed By Harinder Gill)

2005
Des Hoyaa Pardes (Release Date: 14/01/2005) - Gurdas Maan, Juhi Chawla, Divya Dutta, Parmeet Sethi, Sudhir Pandey, Anup Soni, Madhumati, Gurkirtan, Deborah Delarado, Gogi Kohli, Maureen McDonough, Bidya Rao, Gurmeet Sajja (Dir: Manoj Punj)
Nalaik - Bobby Deol (sp app), Guggu Gill, Vivek Shauq, Aarti Puri, Jaspal Bhatti, Vijay Tandon, Kulbir Bandesaro, Jagtar Jaggi, Gurpreet Ghuggi, Harbhajan Jabbal, Jatinder Kaur, (Dir: Ravi Nishad)
Yaraan Naal Baharaan - Raj Babbar, Jimmy Shergill, Juhi Babbar, Anupam Kher, Sunita Dhir, Ketki Dave, Gurpreet Ghuggi, Sonika Gill, Gavie Chahal, Sudeepa Singh (Dir- Manmohan Singh)
Na Kar Badnam Canada Nu - Komal Dhillon, Parminder Gill, Jatinder Sahota, Seema Sidhu, (Dir: Sukhjinder Shera)

2004
Pind Di Kudi - Sarbjeet Cheema, Rima, Sheeba Bhakri, Gurpreet Ghuggi, Veena Malik
Addi Tappa - Dir: Jeet Matharu Producer: Bimal Parmar & Jeet Matharu, Suresh Varsani Writer: Jeet Matharu
Asa Nu Maan Watna Da (Release Date: 07/05/2004) Harbhajan Mann, Kimi Verma, Neeru Bajwa, Kanwaljeet Singh, Deep Dhillon, Navneet Nishan, Gurpreet Ghuggi, Preet Cheema, Vivek Shauq, Sukhwinder Sukhi, Gurdeep Kaur Brar, Nirmaljeet Nijjer, Jagroop Shergill, Dara Nagra, Amritpal, Manav Vij, Dir: Manmohan Singh
Mitter Pyara Nu Haal Mureedan Da Kehna - Dara Singh, Rama Vij, Vindu Singh, Sheeba, Rajeshwari Sachdev, Mukesh Rishi, Deep Dhillon, Navin Nischol, Akshay Kumar (Dir: Ratan Aulakh)

2003
 Badla: the revenge (Release Date: 12/08/2003) - Jaswinder Bhalla, Manjit Saini, Pritpal Kang, Pratap Rana, Gugni Gill, Resham Bhappa, Biloo Badshah, Lali Ghuman (Dir: Mukhtar Singh Mukha)(Bapp Sirsa)

2002
 Jee Aayan Nu

2001
Sikandera - Guggu Gill, Preeti Sapru, Yograj Singh, Bhagwant Mann, Deepika Singh, Malkit Singh Nahal
Jagira - Sukhjinder Shera, Gugni Gill, B. N. Sharma (Dir: Sukhjinder Shera
Khalsa Mero Roop Hai Khaas - Ayesha Jhulka, Avinash Wadhwan, Paramvir, Raymon Singh, Pramod Moutho (Dir: Shyam Ralhan)

See also
List of Indian Punjabi films after 2011
List of Indian Punjabi films between 1991 and 2000
List of Indian Punjabi films between 1981 and 1990
List of Indian Punjabi films between 1971 and 1980
List of Indian Punjabi films before 1970
List of Pakistani films

References 

Cinema of Punjab
Punjabi 2001
Punj